Juniperus tibetica, the Tibetan juniper, is a species of juniper, native to western China in southern Gansu, southeastern Qinghai, Sichuan, and Tibet Autonomous Region, where it grows at high to very high altitudes of .  This species has the highest known elevation treeline in the northern hemisphere.

The highest known stand of J. tibetica was found at 29°42' N 96°45' E at 4900 m in southeastern Tibet (Xizang Autonomous Region, Baxoi County). 

It is usually monoecious (male and female cones on the same plant), but occasionally dioecious (male and female cones on separate plants).

Conservation and uses
It is the only woody plant occurring over large areas of high altitude Tibet, and grows very slowly in the harsh climatic conditions there. The wood is therefore of major importance to local communities for building construction and fuel, and is also burnt for incense. The foliage is also heavily browsed by domestic goats and other livestock. Both uses have resulted in a significant decline in the species' abundance; formerly listed (1998) as not threatened, it has more recently (2005) been re-categorised as Near Threatened.

References

tibetica
Endemic flora of China
Flora of Qinghai
Flora of Gansu
Flora of Sichuan
Flora of Tibet
Vulnerable flora of Asia
Taxonomy articles created by Polbot
Plants described in 1924